Harmanardı can refer to:

 Harmanardı, Besni
 Harmanardı, Kayapınar